William Mount may refer to:

 William Sidney Mount (1807–1868), U.S. painter
 William Mount (Isle of Wight MP) (1787–1869), Member of Parliament for Yarmouth and Newport, Isle of Wight
 William George Mount (1824–1906), MP for Newbury
 Sir William Mount, 1st Baronet (1866–1930), MP for Newbury
 Sir William Mount, 2nd Baronet (1904–1993), British Army officer
 Ferdinand Mount (William Robert Ferdinand Mount, born 1939), British writer, novelist and columnist
 Willie Mount (born 1949), Louisiana politician